Elections to Metropolitan Borough of Southwark were held in 1928.

The borough had ten wards which returned between 3 and 9 members.

Election summary
At the previous elections in 1925 the Ratepayers Association won 44 seats to the Labour Party's 16. The Ratepayers Association was the name adopted for an anti-Labour Party electoral alliance. By 1928 this electoral alliance had ended in two of the ten of wards. In other wards, candidates reverted to running either as Liberals (Progressives) or Municipal Reform (Conservatives).

|}

Election result

|}
Liberal gain 5 from Ratepayers and 1 from Labour

|}
Liberal gain 3 from Ratepayers

|}
No Change

|}
Municipal Reform gain 4 and Liberals 2 from Ratepayers

|}
Municipal Reform gain 9 from Ratepayers

|}
Liberal gain 1 from Ratepayers

|}
Liberal gain 6 from Ratepayers

|}
Labour gain 3 from Ratepayers

|}
No Change

|}
No Change

Notes

References

Council elections in the London Borough of Southwark
1928 in London
1928 English local elections